Zambia competed at the 1996 Summer Olympics in Atlanta, United States.

Medalists

Silver
 Samuel Matete — Athletics, Men's 400 metres Hurdles

Athletics

Men
Track and road events

Women
Track and road events

Key
Note–Ranks given for track events are within the athlete's heat only
Q = Qualified for the next round
q = Qualified for the next round as a fastest loser or, in field events, by position without achieving the qualifying target
NR = National record
N/A = Round not applicable for the event
Bye = Athlete not required to compete in round

Boxing

Men

See also
 Zambia at the 1996 Summer Paralympics

References
Official Olympic Reports
International Olympic Committee results database

Nations at the 1996 Summer Olympics
1996
1996 in Zambian sport